Ethel Marshall (May 6, 1924 - June 12, 2013) was an American badminton player noted for her mobility and shot-making prowess.

Career
An all-around athlete who also excelled in softball and tennis, Marshall won the US Women's Singles title on all seven occasions that she contested it (1947–1953), defeating seventeen-year-old Judy Devlin (Hashman) in the last of these. She also won the US Women's Doubles title in 1952 and 1956 with Beatrice Massman, defeating the Devlin sisters on the latter occasion who had recently won the All-England women's doubles title. Marshall reached the final of US Women's Doubles on several other occasions, the last one in 1974 as she approached her fiftieth birthday.

Marshall was a member of the women's world team champion US Uber Cup squad in 1957 and coached the team in later years. She continued to compete into the 1980s and won numerous national age division titles. In 1956 the Buffalo based Marshall was among the first class of inductees into the U.S. Badminton Hall of Fame, now called the Walk of Fame.

Major tournament victories

References

American female badminton players
1924 births
2013 deaths
21st-century American women